Vancouveria hexandra, the white inside-out flower, is a perennial herb in the barberry family Berberidaceae. It is found in southwestern British Columbia, western Washington and Oregon and northwestern California and is a common understory herb in moist, shady Douglas fir forests.

It gets its name from the small delicate white flowers with petal-like sepals that are swept back abruptly as if in the process of turning inside out. The genus honors George Vancouver, the 18th-century explorer of the Pacific Northwest.

References

External links

 Jepson eFlora (TJM2) treatment of Vancouveria hexandra
U.C. CalPhotos gallery: Vancouveria hexandra

hexandra
Flora of California
Flora of Oregon
Flora of Washington (state)
Flora of the Klamath Mountains
Natural history of the California Coast Ranges
Flora without expected TNC conservation status